The Podocopa are a subclass of ostracods. Members of the subclass Podocopa can be differentiated from the other subclass of ostracods (Myodocopa) by the morphology of the second antenna: the Podocopa have a relatively long endopod, whereas the Myodocopa have a relatively long exopod. The seventh limb of the Podocopa has a variety of forms or is absent, but is never an annulated worm-like limb (as seen in some Myodocopa).

Taxonomy
The following orders and unplaced families are recognised in the subclass Podocopa:
 Order Palaeocopida 
 Order Platycopida 
 Order Podocopida 
 Unplaced families
 Family †Pachydomellidae Berdan & Sohn, 1961 
 Family †Rectellidae Neckaya, 1966 
 Family †Rectonariidae Gruendel, 1962

References

External links
 

 
Arthropod subclasses